Professor Sanath Lamabathusooriya, MBE is a Sri Lankan academic and paediatrician. An Emeritus Professor of Paediatrics, he was the former Dean of the Faculty of Medicine, University of Colombo and one of the foremost paediatricians in Sri Lanka.

Educated at the Royal College, Colombo, he went on to study medicine at the Colombo Medical College, University of Ceylon graduating with an MBBS degree. Specializing in paediatrics he spent many years at the Lady Ridgeway Hospital for Children. Later he became a lecture and professor of  paediatrics at the University of Ruhuna. During this time he played a major role in the Sri Lanka Cleft Palate Project. In 1991 he was appointed as Chair and Head of Department of Paediatrics of the Faculty of Medicine, University of Colombo and served as the Dean of the faculty in 2002-2005 whilst concurrently serving as head of the department retiring in 2008. He was elected President of the Asian Pacific Paediatric Association.

For his work in the Sri Lanka Cleft Palate Project he was made a Member of the Order of the British Empire (MBE) by Queen Elizabeth and on his retirement his portrait was unveiled at the Lady Ridgeway Children's Hospital.

References

Sri Lankan pediatricians
Sinhalese academics
Alumni of Royal College, Colombo
Alumni of the University of Ceylon (Colombo)
Academic staff of the University of Colombo
Ceylonese Members of the Order of the British Empire
Living people
Year of birth missing (living people)